Velike Rebrce is a settlement on the left bank of the Krka River in the Municipality of Ivančna Gorica in central Slovenia. The area is part of the historical region of Lower Carniola. The municipality is now included in the Central Slovenia Statistical Region. 

A Roman period burial ground was discovered near the settlement in the late 19th century.

References

External links
Velike Rebrce at Geopedia

Populated places in the Municipality of Ivančna Gorica